This is a list of Democratic-Republican Party candidates for the offices of President of the United States and Vice President of the United States. Opponents who received over one percent of the popular vote or ran an official campaign that received Electoral College votes are listed. Offices held prior to Election Day are included, and those held on Election Day have an italicized end date.

List of Democratic-Republican tickets

1792

1796, 1800, 1804

1808, 1812

1816, 1820

1824

Other candidates

In addition to the individuals listed above, other Democratic-Republicans received electoral votes between 1792 and 1824. In the 1792 election, George Washington effectively ran unopposed for president, but the nascent Democratic-Republican Party attempted to defeat Vice President John Adams's bid for re-election through the candidacy of George Clinton. Thomas Jefferson and Aaron Burr also received votes in that election. In the 1796 election, Clinton, Samuel Adams, and John Henry each received votes. In the 1808 election, John Langdon, James Madison, and James Monroe all received votes for vice president, while Clinton received a small number of votes for president. In the 1824 election, Martin Van Buren received nine electoral votes for vice president. During that same election, the Democratic-Republican congressional nominating caucus nominated a ticket consisting of William H. Crawford and former Secretary of the Treasury Albert Gallatin, but Gallatin ultimately withdrew from the race.

In the 1812 election, Madison's main opponent, DeWitt Clinton, was nominated for president by a legislative caucus of New York Democratic-Republicans. The Federalist Party did not officially nominate Clinton, but most Federalist leaders tacitly supported Clinton's candidacy in hopes of defeating Madison.

Notes

References

Works cited

 
 
 

Democratic-Republican
Democratic Party (United States)-related lists